Zombieland is an American media franchise centering on a college aged kid making his way through the zombie apocalypse, meeting three strangers along the way and together taking an extended road trip across the Southwestern United States in an attempt to find a sanctuary free from zombies. It consists of two films and a tie-in-game. The films are produced by Pariah 2.0 Entertainment, a division of Sony Pictures Releasing under its Columbia Pictures. The series features The film stars Woody Harrelson, Jesse Eisenberg, Emma Stone, and Abigail Breslin as survivors of a zombie apocalypse. Two films have been released in the series thus far: the original film of the same name in 2009, and a sequel Zombieland: Double Tap in 2019.

Films

Zombieland (2009)

Two months have passed since a strain of mad cow disease mutated into "mad person disease" that became "mad zombie disease", which overran the entire United States (with the infection presumably spreading to the rest of the world), turning many Americans into vicious zombies. Survivors of the zombie epidemic have learned that growing attached to other survivors is not advisable because they could die at any moment, so many have taken to using their city of origin as nicknames.

Zombieland: Double Tap (2019)

Zombieland: Double Tap takes place six years after the first film. The four main characters from the first film decide  to move into the White House.

Future	
On the possibility of a third film, Fleischer can't decide if the cast will return or not. He has stated that he "would love to do a Madison stand-alone movie."

Television
In October 2011, it was reported that Fox Broadcasting Company and Sony Pictures were considering a television adaption of the series to be aired on CBS, with Paul Wernick and Rhett Reese writing the script, but with the main actors of the original film likely not returning. The television program was planned to begin in Fall 2012. These plans did not come to fruition. In January 2013, it was revealed that the casting call for the production just went out for the main characters, with a few changes to the movie for the show and the addition of two new characters, Atlanta and Ainsley. There was a pilot episode created and aired by Amazon along with several other pilots, but it was not one of the 2 chosen to go into production for a full season.

Video games

Zombieland: Double Tap – Road Trip

Reception

Box office performance

Critical and public response

Cast and characters

References

Horror film franchises
Film series introduced in 2009
Columbia Pictures franchises